The Tatyasaheb Kore Institute of Engineering & Technology (abbreviated TKIET), (An Autonomous Institute) established in 1983, offers courses in Computer science and engineering, Mechanical engineering, Chemical engineering, Civil engineering and Electronics & Telecommunications engineering in UG and Mechanical engineering, Civil engineering and Electronics & Telecommunication engineering for PG level. TKIET is recognized by the government of Maharashtra, and is approved by the All India Council of Technical Education, New Delhi. It is accredited by the National Board of Accreditation (NBA), New Delhi. In year 2016 the institute was accredited by NAAC 'A' grade with CGPA 3.27 which is highest in Shivaji University. The Institute is affiliated with Shivaji University, Kolhapur. 

The  TKIET campus is 30 km northwest of Kolhapur city in rural Warananagar. The institute has over 2000 students from across the nation.

History 
 Tatyasaheb Kore Institute of Engineering and Technology (TKIET) was established in 1983. The institute is located at Warananagar, 30 km away from Kolhapur a district headquarter and 10 km to the west from Kini-Wathar on Pune-Bangalore National Highway NH-4. TKIET has emerged as one of the leading technological institutes in Western Maharashtra. The institute's lush green campus spreads over 30 acres.

Departments 

Courses offered are:
Undergraduate
 Computer Science Engineering
 Civil Engineering
 Electronics & Telecommunication Engineering
 Chemical Engineering
 Mechanical Engineering

Post-Graduate

 Chemical Engineering
 Electronics & Telecommunication Engineering
 Mechanical (Design) Engineering
 Construction Management (civil)

Ph. D
 Chemical Engineering
 Mechanical Engineering (proposed)
 Civil Engineering (proposed)

Hostels

There are 11 hostels (7 for boys and 2 for girls). All the hostels are named after notable persons in India.

The boys' hostels are:
Bhaskar
Raman
Tilak
Sir Visvesvaraya (S.V)
Bhabha
Shivaji
Nehru

The girls' hostels are:
Savitri Bai Phule

Placements

The Training and Placement Cell of TKIET, Warananagar handles campus placement of the engineering graduates.
Students from TKIET are working with multinational companies such as Merrill Lynch, Nomura, Microsoft Technologies, Sun Systems, IBM, Ford, and Hyundai.

Also the top companies in India have students from TKIET like L&T, TCS, Wipro, SBI, Mahindra and Mahindra, Mindtree, BSF and many more.

Institute Achievements
Institute is accredited by NAAC with grade ‘A’

Awarded as one of the Best Engineering College Campus in the country.

College grabbed platinum recognition by AICTE and CII survey for industrial collaboration.

Many professors from the institute received best faculty award by Indian Society for Technical Education (ISTE), New Delhi.

See also
 List of universities in India
 Universities and colleges in India
 Education in India

References

External links
 http://www.tkietwarana.org/

Universities and colleges in Maharashtra
Kolhapur district
Shivaji University
Educational institutions established in 1983
1983 establishments in Maharashtra